Würzjoch (el. 2003 m.) is a mountain pass in the province of South Tyrol in Italy. 

It connects the city of Brixen in the Eisacktal with San Martin de Tor in the Val Badia.

The pass road is in good condition, but narrow and closed in winter. On the south side, the road is open during winter up to the Plose ski resort.

External links 

Mountain passes of South Tyrol
Mountain passes of the Dolomites